"Willie Got Me Stoned" (also sometimes referred as "Willie Got Me Stoned and Stole All of My Money") is a song by American musician Jack Johnson from the deluxe edition of the 2017 album All the Light Above It Too. The song was released on April 20, 2018, and was the fifth single from the album.

Composition 
Jack Johnson wrote the song as a tribute to the country singer Willie Nelson. Johnson said that "a great song is just three chords and the truth." He also said that it was a "real honor" to just spend a night with Nelson. Johnson refers to the night which he played poker with Nelson, and he lost consciousness, lost pride, and all hope when he got stoned with Nelson. During that night the two men also went out and smoked pot together. Johnson originally composed the song before Farm Aid 2015 in Saratoga Springs when he performed the song off of a sheet of paper he wrote on. Then the title of the song was "Willie Got Me Stoned and Stole All of My Money."

Recording 
The song was recorded in the summer of 2017 at the 11th show of his All the Light Above it Too World Tour in Fiddler's Green Amphitheatre.

Live performance 
Johnson performed the song during his All the Light Above It Too World Tour, and during Farm Aid 2015. He has performed the song 29 times in total.

Personnel 
Adapted from Jack Johnson's website.
 Jack Johnson – lead vocals, guitar, and ukulele
 Zach Gill – accordion, piano, harmonica, and backing vocals
 Adam Topol – drums and percussion
 Merlo Podlewski – bass guitar, guitar, and backing vocals

References 

Songs about musicians
Cultural depictions of American men
Cultural depictions of country musicians
Songs about cannabis
2018 songs
Jack Johnson (musician) songs
2018 singles
Songs written by Jack Johnson (musician)